Salva is a commune in Bistrița-Năsăud County, Transylvania, Romania. It is composed of a single village, Salva, and included Runcu Salvei village until the latter was split off to form a separate commune in 2005.

It is a relatively important local railway junction on the line to Sighetu Marmației and line to Vatra Dornei and Suceava.

Natives
Maria Butaciu

References

Communes in Bistrița-Năsăud County
Localities in Transylvania